Gentlemen of Nerve  is a 1914 American comedy silent film directed by Charles Chaplin, starring Chaplin and Mabel Normand, and produced by Mack Sennett for Keystone Studios.

Plot
Mabel and her beau go to an auto race and are joined by Charlie and his friend. As Charlie's friend is attempting to enter the raceway through a hole, the friend gets stuck and a policeman shows up.

Reviews
A reviewer from Bioscope wrote, "Charles Chaplin, as the very broke gentleman who is anxious to make love to all the pretty girls assembled to watch some daring motor-races, manages to obtain an abundance of humor out of every situation.  It is just the type of film that audiences have grown to appreciate with great gusto."

Motion Picture News commented, " Charlie, Chester and Mabel attend an auto race.  Results?  As laughable as were ever pictured."

Cast
 Charles Chaplin - Mr. Wow-Woe
 Mabel Normand - Mabel
 Chester Conklin - Mr. Walrus
 Mack Swain - Ambrose
 Phyllis Allen - Flirty woman
 Edgar Kennedy - Policeman
 Alice Davenport - Patron

See also
 List of American films of 1914

External links

 

 Gentlemen of Nerve at the Progressive Silent Film List

1914 films
1914 comedy films
Short films directed by Charlie Chaplin
American black-and-white films
American silent short films
Silent American comedy films
Keystone Studios films
Films produced by Mack Sennett
1914 short films
Articles containing video clips
American comedy short films
1910s American films